The black-faced sandgrouse (Pterocles decoratus) is a species of bird in the Pteroclidae family. It is found in Ethiopia, Kenya, Somalia, Tanzania, and Uganda.

Subspecies

There are three subspecies:
P. d. decoratus - SE Kenya and E Tanzania
P. d. ellenbecki - NE Uganda and N Kenya, Ethiopia and Somalia
P. d. loveridgei - W Kenya and W Tanzania

Breeding Patterns
The breeding season of birds such as the sandgrouse which live in semi-arid tropics correlates with rainfall, thus the true extent or timing at which the breeding season will occur is highly unpredictable. Little is known about the duration and variation of the sandgrouse's breeding in Kenya, although it is most likely to breed in the dry season following the long rains. Its reproductive organs are known to increase largely in size during breeding season, despite the scarcity of the breeding patterns.

References

black-faced sandgrouse
Birds of East Africa
black-faced sandgrouse
Taxonomy articles created by Polbot